Frank Lackteen (born Mohammed Hassan Lackteen August 29, 1897 – July 8, 1968) was an American film actor best known for his antagonistic roles. He appeared in nearly 200 films between 1915 and 1965, including several Three Stooges shorts.

Biography
Lackteen made his first American film in 1915 and was often seen as a villain in silent films. Many of his film appearances came in Westerns and serials.

Lackteen was born in Kab-Elias, Lebanon, and attended an American school in Lebanon. He spent most of his childhood in Lawrence, Massachusetts. 

He died from a respiratory failure on July 8, 1968, aged 70, in Woodland Hills, Los Angeles.

Selected filmography

References

External links
 
 

1897 births
1968 deaths
American male film actors
American male silent film actors
American male television actors
Burials at Valhalla Memorial Park Cemetery
Deaths from respiratory failure
Male film serial actors
American people of Lebanese descent
Emigrants from the Ottoman Empire to the United States
20th-century American male actors
20th-century American comedians